Holidays in the Danger Zone: Rivers is a five-part travel documentary on dangerous rivers, part of the Holidays in the Danger Zone series, produced and broadcast by BBC This World. Written and presented by Ben Anderson, and produced by Will Daws. It was first broadcast between 21 February - 7 March  2006, on BBC Two.

Episode 1: Amazon
Episode 2: Ganges
Episode 3: Euphrates
Episode 4: The Jordan
Episode 5: Congo

In the series, Anderson journeys down some of the world's most dangerous rivers, exploring life and the daily struggle to exist beside rivers that have been the course of so much political unrest. Starting with the Amazon, Anderson journey takes him into the Andes, where the effects of altitude sickness at the source of the Amazon take its toll on him. Then in India, Anderson visits the rapidly melting Satopanth Glacier that feeds the Ganges, its possibly impacted with Pakistan over control over water rights, before visiting the holy city of Varanasi where the massive amount of burials and cremations has caused the Ganges to become highly polluted; it is the fifth most polluted river of the world as of 2007, and a modern health hazard to everything that depends on the river for life. Anderson then goes to the Euphrates and the Jordan, both ancient rivers, steeped in history of a troubled region, before ending on the Congo which, like the nation it cuts through, has seen much violence in recent years.

See also
 Holidays in the Danger Zone
 Holidays in the Axis of Evil 
 America Was Here 
 The Violent Coast 
 Meet the Stans
 Places That Don't Exist

References

External links 
 BBC-World's re-broadcast page includes a synopsis for each of the four segments.

BBC television documentaries
BBC World News shows
Documentaries about politics